Patrik Fredriksson (born 16 May 1973) is a former professional tennis player from Sweden. He stopped playing professional 2001 and in 2002 became the Davis Cup coach and head coach for the national team in Kuwait.

Career
Fredriksson, who reached a career high ranking of 84 in the world, never made it past the first round of a Grand Slam singles draw. The closest he came was in the 1997 French Open when he lost a five set match to Frédéric Fontang. In the doubles however he reached the second round in his only attempt, at the 1997 US Open, with Tom Vanhoudt as his partner.

He was twice a singles quarter-finalist on the ATP Tour, in the 1996 Stockholm Open and at the Swedish Open in 1997. At Singapore in 1996 he had a win over world number 26 and third seed Paul Haarhuis. As a doubles career player he was runner-up at two ATP Tour events.

ATP career finals

Doubles: 2 (2 runner-ups)

ATP Challenger and ITF Futures finals

Singles: 10 (7–3)

Doubles: 5 (1–4)

Performance timeline

Singles

References

External links 
 
 

1973 births
Living people
Swedish male tennis players
People from Växjö
Sportspeople from Kronoberg County